Fadime Suna Çelik (born October 25, 1986 in Eskişehir) is a Turkish female middle distance and long distance runner. She is a member of the Beşiktaş J.K. Athletics Team in Istanbul.

Fadime Suna began her athletics career following an unsuccessful start in basketball in the primary school. She says she is thankful to her teacher, who draw her attention to running.

She won the gold medal in the 10,000 m event at the 2011 Summer Universiade held in Shenzhen, China.

In 2019, she competed in the women's marathon at the 2019 World Athletics Championships held in Doha, Qatar. She did not finish her race.

Achievements

References

External links
 

1986 births
Living people
Sportspeople from Eskişehir
Turkish female long-distance runners
Turkish female middle-distance runners
Turkish female steeplechase runners
Beşiktaş J.K. athletes
Universiade medalists in athletics (track and field)
Universiade gold medalists for Turkey
Medalists at the 2011 Summer Universiade